FC Energetik Karaköl is a Kyrgyzstani football club based in Karaköl, Kyrgyzstan that played in the top division in Kyrgyzstan, the Kyrgyzstan League.

Achievements 
Kyrgyzstan League:
10th place: 1999

Kyrgyzstan Cup:

Current squad

External links 
Career stats by KLISF

Football clubs in Kyrgyzstan